Eyðvør Klakstein (born 5 September 1995) is a Faroese football midfielder who currently plays for KÍ. From August 2015 until May 2016 she was playing for CD Marino in the second best football division in Spain.

Honours 
KÍ
Winner
 1. deild kvinnur (9): 2010, 2011, 2012, 2013, 2014, 2015, 2016, 2019, 2020,
 Faroese Women's Cup (7): 2010, 2012, 2013, 2014, 2015, 2016, 2020,

International goals
Scores and results list Faroe Islands' goal tally first.

References

External links 
 

1995 births
Living people
Women's association football midfielders
Faroese women's footballers
Faroe Islands women's youth international footballers
Faroe Islands women's international footballers
Faroese expatriate footballers
Faroese expatriates in Spain
Expatriate women's footballers in Spain
KÍ Klaksvík players